Wołyń District League was a regional association football championship in the Wołyń Voivodeship, Poland (then Second Polish Republic) in 1930–1939.

The league was created in 1930 based on Volhynian competitions that in 1928–29 were under temporary administration of the Lwów District Football Union and teams that since 1922 competed in the Lublin District League.

The competitions were conducted on territory of modern West Ukraine which during the World War II was annexed by the Soviet Union and added to the Soviet Ukraine (Ukrainian Soviet Socialist Republic). The Wołyń District League is considered to be a football precursor of the Volyn Oblast Football Federation and Rivne Oblast Football Federation championships in the modern Ukraine.

Winners of the league qualified to regional play-offs, a winner of which was advancing to the newly formed National League.

Lwów District League administration
Separate football competitions were established in 1928 in Wołyń Voivodeship under administration of the Lwów District Football Union (OZPN) as a separate subgroup out teams that previously competed in the Lublin District League. Hallerczyki Równe, Sokół Równe, WKS Kowel previously competed in the Lublin District League. 

Winners of the newly established competitions were not allowed to the promotional play-offs.

Own administration
List of the top tier's winners of the district league

Winners
 4 – PKS Łuck
 3 – Hallerczyki Równe
 2 – Hasmonea Równe
 1 – 3 clubs (WKS Kowel, Sokół Równe, Strzelec Janowa Dolina)

See also
 Rivne Oblast Football Federation
 Football Federation of Volyn

Notes

References

External links
 Jan Goksiński. Football in Volhynia (Futbol na Wołyniu). Sportowa Historia.pl. 2013-10-21

2
History of football in Poland
Lwów Voivodeship
Lublin Voivodeship
Wołyń Voivodeship (1921–1939)
History of Volyn Oblast
History of Rivne Oblast